Oxley United  is an Australian football (soccer) club based in Corinda, Queensland. The club was established in 1913 and is the oldest extant club in continuous existence in the Brisbane region. Oxley United had its golden age in the late 1950s and early 1960s, winning the Brisbane First Division in 1958, and competing in Australia's first national cup competition, the 1962 Australia Cup. Oxley United FC currently competes in the Capital League 2 competition.

History
Oxley Football Club commenced informally in 1912, and went on to form a squad of players and enter competitive fixtures in 1913. Oxley fielded a senior team in the lower divisions of the Brisbane competition in the years immediately after the First World War, but only entered junior teams competitively during the 1920s. with regular success in the junior divisions. During this early period, Oxley FC was regularly referred to as the Oxley Ramblers and entered a senior team in the Ipswich and West Moreton League, a breakaway competition for the Ipswich clubs in 1930 and again in 1936, though was said to have been amalgamated with Redbank Seekers in April.  The club then joined the Brisbane competition as Oxley United in 1937, completing two seasons in Division One and achieving fourth place in 1938.

After the Second World War, Oxley United rejoined Brisbane's senior competition and won the Second Division at their first attempt in 1946. Relegated after a season, Oxley played two further seasons in Division Two, then withdrew from senior football in 1950. Recommencing in Division Five in 1951, Oxley United achieved consecutive promotions through the divisions to reach Division One by 1954.

Oxley United FC then played in Brisbane's Division One continuously from 1954 until 1970. The club's finest season was 1958, winning the Division One championship, the Tristram Shield and the Hilton Shield. The following season, Oxley United lost the 1959 Division One title on goal average to Annerley,  but won the Ampol Cup by a massive 8–3 margin in the Final over the same club.

The club qualified for the Division One final series in 1961 and 1962 but failed to make the grand final. Their third place finish in the 1962 Brisbane First Division season qualified them for the 1962 Australia Cup in which they were eliminated 5–2 in the first round by St George Budapest of Sydney.

Oxley United remained in the top flight of Brisbane football until 1973, except a single season in the second division when they won the 1971 Division Two title. For the next 20 years, the club went into a period of slow but steady decline at a senior level, falling as low as Division Six by 1996. Re-instated to Division Two in 1997, Oxley United has competed in Tier 3 or 4 of the Brisbane football structure for the past 20 seasons, and have participated in every Capital League 2 (Tier 3) season since the Football Brisbane re-structure of 2013.

Recent Seasons

Source:

The tier is the level in the Australian soccer league system

Honours
Due to frequent restructures and re-classifications of divisions in Brisbane football, the club’s first team honours below are listed by tier in the Brisbane football pyramid.

Tier 1
Brisbane Premiers 1929 (Oxley Ramblers)
Brisbane Division 1 – Premiers 1958
Tristram Shield – winner 1958
Hilton Shield – winner 1958
Ampol Cup – winner 1959

Tier 2
Brisbane Division 2 – Premiers 1946, 1953
Brisbane Division 2 – Premiers 1971

Tier 3
Brisbane Division 3 – Premiers 1952

Tier 4
Brisbane Division 3 – Grand Final winner 1983
Brisbane Division 4 – Premiers 1989

Tier 5
Brisbane Division 5 – Premiers 1951

External links
 Official club website

References 

Soccer clubs in Brisbane
Brisbane Premier League teams
Association football clubs established in 1913
1913 establishments in Australia